Regina Grabolle (born 18 May 1965) is a retired German artistic gymnast. She won two bronze medals at the 1979 World Artistic Gymnastics Championships, on the balance beam and in the team competition.

References

External links
 Balance beam

1965 births
Living people
German female artistic gymnasts
Medalists at the World Artistic Gymnastics Championships